Gravelly Brook is a tributary of Matawan Creek in Monmouth County, New Jersey in the United States.

Gravelly Brook's source is in the Mount Pleasant Hills, flowing north into Matawan Creek.

Tributaries
Watson's Brook

See also
List of rivers of New Jersey

Rivers of Monmouth County, New Jersey
Rivers of New Jersey